
Year 210 BC was a year of the pre-Julian Roman calendar. At the time it was known as the Year of the Consulship of Marcellus and Laevinus (or, less frequently, year 544 Ab urbe condita). The denomination 210 BC for this year has been used since the early medieval period, when the Anno Domini calendar era became the prevalent method in Europe for naming years.

Events 
 By place 
 Roman Republic 
 Following the death of his father, Publius Cornelius Scipio, and his uncle, Gnaeus Cornelius Scipio Calvus, at the hands of the Carthaginians, the young Publius Cornelius Scipio takes over command of the Roman troops in Spain. His appointment reflects the Roman Senate's dissatisfaction with the cautious strategy of the propraetor, Gaius Claudius Nero, then commander in Spain north of the Ebro.
 The famine and inflation facing Rome is eased with the pacification, by the Romans, of Sicily.
 The Carthaginian general Hannibal proves his superiority in tactics by inflicting a severe defeat at Herdonia in Apulia upon a proconsular army, slaying the consul Gnaeus Fulvius Centumalus Maximus.
 The Roman general Marcus Claudius Marcellus is elected consul for the fourth time and takes Salapia in Apulia, which has revolted and joined forces with Hannibal.
The Spanish language evolves from Vulgar Latin, which was brought to the Iberian Peninsula by the Romans during the Second Punic War.

 Egypt 
 Arsinoe III, wife and sister of King Ptolemy IV gives birth to the future Ptolemy V Epiphanes. Thereafter, she is sequestered in the palace, while Ptolemy's depraved male and female favourites ruin both the king and his government of Egypt. Although Arsinoe III disapproves of the sordid state of the court, she is unable to exert any influence.

 Greece 
 After allying with Hannibal, Philip V of Macedon attacks the Roman positions in Illyria, but fails to take Corcyra or Apollonia, which are protected by the Roman fleet. Rome's command of the sea prevents his lending any effective aid to his Carthaginian ally in Italy. The Aetolians, Sparta and King Attalus of Pergamum join the Romans in the war against Philip V. This coalition is so strong that Philip V has to stop attacking Roman territory.

 China 
 Qin Er Shi becomes Emperor of the Qin Dynasty of China. His advisors Zhao Gao and Prime Minister Li Si forge a decree by the late Emperor Qin Shi Huang that orders the execution of Qin Er Shi's elder brother Fusu and Fusu's ally, the general Meng Tian.
 The Terracotta Army in the mausoleum of Emperor Shihuangdi, Lintong, Shaanxi, is made (Qin Dynasty) (approximate date).

Births 
 Hui, emperor of the Han Dynasty (d. 188 BC)
 Ptolemy V Epiphanes, king of Egypt (d. 180 BC)
 Zhang Yan, Chinese empress of the Han Dynasty (d. 163 BC)

Deaths 
 Qin Shi Huang, first emperor of China (b. 259 BC)
 Fusu, son and heir apparent of Qin Shi Huang
 Gnaeus Fulvius Centumalus Maximus, Roman consul and general
 Meng Tian, Chinese general of the Qin Dynasty
 Meng Yi, Chinese official of the Qin Dynasty
 Tiberius Sempronius Longus, Roman consul and general
 Bashu Guafu Qing, Chinese businesswoman (b. 259 BC)

References